The 2014–15 season was Colchester United's 73rd season in their history and seventh successive season in the third tier of English football, League One. Alongside competing in the League One, the club also participated in the FA Cup, the League Cup and the Football League Trophy.

A string of four consecutive defeats meant Joe Dunne lost his job and Tony Humes was appointed his replacement. Colchester had an upturn in league form and leapt to mid-table, but soon a string of poor results mean the U's spent much of the campaign in the relegation zone. Aside from after a home win over Bristol Rovers in February, United were in the bottom four from late November until the final day of the season, when results went in their favour and they beat Preston North End to secure League One survival by the narrowest of margins.

For the fourth successive year, Colchester failed to reach the second round of the League Cup following defeat by Charlton Athletic, and despite a bye to the second round of the Football League Trophy, Gillingham won 4–2 on penalties at the Colchester Community Stadium. Colchester did reach the third round of the FA Cup, featuring in two televised matches. Cardiff City comfortably beat the U's 3–1 following a first round win at Gosport Borough and a second round victory at home to Peterborough United.

Season overview

Pre-season
Days after the final game of the 2013–14 season, Joe Dunne began making changes to his playing squad. Club stalwart Karl Duguid announced his retirement after playing in the final game of the season, while Clinton Morrison's impending exit was announced prior to the last match.

In the midst of financial cutbacks, the club were unable to offer competitive terms to club captain Brian Wilson, who departed in search of a new club. Also leaving were Academy graduates Jordan Sanderson and Shaun Phillips, while Ryan Dickson was offered new terms after his one-year deal expired.

Colchester made their first signing of the campaign on 14 May as young striker Dominic Smith signed following his release from Crewe Alexandra. He had been on trial with the under-23 side during the latter stages of the 2013–14 season.

On 22 May, Dominic Vose signed a contract extension until summer 2016, while Ryan Dickson decided against a new deal at the club and opted to join League One rivals Crawley Town.

Long-serving goalkeeper Mark Cousins decided to end his ten-year association with the club to instead sign for Dagenham & Redbridge on 23 June.

On 1 July, Colchester brought in a trio of new players to fill the void left by the departing Cousins, Dickson, and Wilson. Former Southend United and Gillingham right-back Sean Clohessy joined the club on a two-year deal, Ben Gordon signed on a free transfer from Ross County, and former Dagenham & Redbridge goalkeeper Chris Lewington also signed a two-tear contract.

Josh Thompson and David Wright signed new one-year deals on 3 July, and on 8 July, Colchester signed former Braintree Town striker Dan Holman on a two-year deal.

Colchester played their first game of pre-season on 12 July against Brantham Athletic. The U's won 4–1 with goals from Dominic Vose, Jabo Ibehre, Freddie Sears and Dan Holman. Three days later they played Heybridge Swifts as triallist George Moncur, David Wright, and a brace from Sears gave them a 4–0 half-time lead. In the second-half, they continued the scoring with goals registered by Gavin Massey, Vose and an Ibehre brace sealed an 8–0 win. They then put four past AFC Sudbury on 17 July with Sears, Drey Wright, Sammie Szmodics and Holman the scorers.

Freddie Sears continued his goalscoring for on 19 July as Colchester won 8–1 at Leiston. He scored four, while Holman, Massey, Szmodics and Drey Wright scored the rest.

On 23 July, Colchester played their first home friendly of pre-season against neighbours Ipswich Town. Town scored twice in the first twelve minutes of the second-half through Frank Nouble while Jack Marriott added a third later on for the visitors.

Colchester were held to a 2–2 draw at Dover Athletic on 25 July, Josh Thompson and Sammie Szmodics the scorers, before a 4–3 victory over Dagenham Redbridge on 26 July. Macauley Bonne scored his first goal of pre-season, but the U's found themselves 3–1 down at the hour mark. Five minutes later, they began their fight back, as Vose scored once and then scored the equaliser on 76-minutes. Jabo Ibehre scored the U's winner two minutes later.

On 29 July, Colchester faced Luton Town, where they were held to a 2–2 draw following a Paul Connolly own goal and a Jabo Ibehre goal.

The club's final pre-season friendly was a 2–0 defeat at Conference South side Bishop's Stortford on 30 July.

On 7 August, after training with the club throughout pre-season, George Moncur signed for the club on loan from West Ham United until 11 January 2015. The same day, following the departure of Brian Wilson, Magnus Okuonghae was appointed club captain, with Sean Clohessy named vice-captain.

August
Colchester faced Oldham Athletic in the opening game of the season on 9 August. The U's scored first after seven minutes through Magnus Okuonghae, but Oldham equalised through Jonathan Forte on 18-minutes, before he gave them the lead in the 40th-minute. Making his debut from the bench, George Moncur levelled the game again on 58-minutes to draw the match 2–2.

Colchester had been drawn against Championship opposition in the first round of the League Cup as they travelled to Charlton Athletic on 12 August. The side once again failed to reach the second round as they suffered a 4–0 defeat. Magnus Okuonghae also found himself sent off for deliberate handball in the penalty area, from which Charlton converted.

On 16 August, Colchester travelled to Ashton Gate Stadium to play Bristol City. George Moncur scored his second goal in as many league games after nine minutes, but City equalised immediately after half-time through Aaron Wilbraham. He scored his second in the 68th-minute to hand the hosts a 2–1 win.

Notts County beat Colchester 2–1 at Meadow Lane on 19 August. They conceded after six minutes when Ronan Murray scored. Freddie Sears equalised on 69-minutes, but Liam Noble scored shortly afterwards with a shot from outside of the box.

Colchester's winless run continued on 23 August as they were defeated 1–0 at home by Doncaster Rovers. They then suffered another home defeat as Peterborough United won 3–1 at the Colchester Community Stadium. Peterborough took a two goal lead before half-time, but Freddie Sears pulled one back on 64-minutes. However, Jermaine Anderson scored 13-minutes from time to seal the victory.

September
Following the club's winless start to the season, manager Joe Dunne left the club by mutual consent on 1 September. Chairman Robbie Cowling acted quickly to replace Dunne by promoting Tony Humes to position of first-team manager, having previously overseen youth development at the club and had guided the under-18 side to a league and cup double in the 2013–14 season.

On 2 September, Humes made his first signing as he brought in youngster Byron Lawrence from Ipswich Town on a one-year deal.

In Humes' first match in charge on 6 September, he took his Colchester side to face Walsall. He handed Dominic Smith his professional debut when he was sent on as a second-half substitute for Gavin Massey, but the U's were unable to break the deadlock in a 0–0 draw, their first clean sheet of the season.

Colchester claimed their first victory of the campaign on 13 September at Leyton Orient. They were down to ten men just before the break when Magnus Okuonghae received his second red card of the season. Despite this, Colchester took the lead through Sanchez Watt on 62-minutes. On 73-minutes, Freddie Sears doubled the U's lead to hand Humes his first win as manager.

On 16 September, Colchester hosted Sheffield United. George Moncur scored his third goal of the season on 31-minutes, and in the second-half Freddie Sears doubled the hosts lead with 13-minutes remaining. However, the Blades commenced on a comeback when Ben Davies scored on 83-minutes, before Ryan Flynn levelled the score two minutes later. In the 88th-minute, Sheffield completed a six-minute salvo when Davies converted a penalty after Alex Gilbey had fouled Stefan Scougall in the area.

On 19 September, Dan Holman joined Conference National side Wrexham on loan for one-month, while Cardiff City forward Rhys Healey arrived on a loan deal that would run until 20 December. Meanwhile, development squad striker Nnamdi Nwachuku made a loan move to Leiston.

Colchester were held to a 0–0 home draw by Bradford City on 20 September.

Kane Vincent-Young signed a one-year deal following a trial with the under-21 side on 23 September.

Colchester moved out of the relegation zone on 27 September following a 3–0 win at bottom club Crewe Alexandra. Freddie Sears scored his fifth goal of the season on 57-minutes. New recruit Rhys Healey was brought on as a substitute for Craig Eastmond and duly scored shortly after his arrival on the pitch. Sanchez Watt completed the scoring for the visitors on 67-minutes.

October
Rhys Healey scored on his first start for the club after 16-minutes of Colchester's game at Preston North End on 3 October. However, Preston equalised four minutes later before taking the lead four minutes after that. Alex Gilbey scored his first goal of the season to level the scored on 37-minutes. Preston retook the lead shortly after half-time before Chris Humphrey sealed a 4–2 victory on 57-minutes.

On 6 October, Colchester made another loan signing with Ipswich Town right-back Elliott Hewitt joining for one month, while David Fox signed a short-term deal after training with the club.

Having received a bye in the first round, Colchester crashed out of the Football League Trophy on penalties following a 3–3 draw with Gillingham on 7 October. Drey Wright scored his first goal of the season to open the scoring on 17-minutes, but Brennan Dickenson later equalised. Sanchez Watt made it 2–1 from the penalty spot after Rhys Healey had been fouled in the area, but Bradley Dack allowed the visitors to equalise once again. They then took the lead with 16-minutes remaining when Antonio German scored. Freddie Sears scored a late equaliser, meaning the match went to a penalty shoot-out. George Moncur and Tom Eastman missed their penalties for Colchester as Gillingham won 4–2.

Having not featured under Tony Humes, Jabo Ibehre was allowed to leave the club on loan to Oldham on 9 October. The same day, youth team graduate Sammie Szmodics signed a -year contract extension with the club.

On 11 October, Colchester came from behind to beat Fleetwood Town 2–1 courtesy of a Gavin Massey brace.

After scoring a brace in his previous game, Massey, alongside defenders Tom Eastman and Frankie Kent, all signed contract extensions with the club on 16 October. Eastman agreed a deal until 2016, Massey until 2017, and Kent until 2018.

On 18 October, Colchester were held to a 1–1 draw by Scunthorpe United at Glanford Park, Freddie Sears with the U's goal.

On 21 October, Colchester hosted Chesterfield. The visitors scored in controversial fashion with less than a minute on the clock after Frankie Kent had been floored by a powerful strike in the face. Referee Darren Sheldrake allowed play to continue as Sam Clucas scored. At half-time Rhys Healey replaced George Moncur and scored within five minutes of his arrival. Four minutes from the full-time whistle, Freddie Sears scored once again to earn all three points for Colchester.

Dan Holman was loaned out once again on 24 October, on this occasion to Aldershot Town for one month. Joining him in leaving the club on loan was Josh Thompson, yet to appear this season. He joined League Two's bottom club Tranmere Rovers on loan until January.

Colchester earned a 2–2 draw at Swindon Town on 25 October. Former U's loanee Michael Smith had given his side the lead in the first-half, but Rhys Healey levelled after the break. Smith then scored once more only for Gavin Massey to score an equaliser shortly afterwards.

November
On 1 November, Port Vale won 2–1 at the Community Stadium, Freddie Sears with the consolation goal for Colchester.

On 4 November, prior to the U's FA Cup first round tie on 9 November, Humes bolstered his forward line with the acquisition of Kemar Roofe on loan from West Bromwich Albion for one month.

In the first round of the FA Cup, Colchester were drawn against Conference South outfit Gosport Borough who were featuring in the first round of the Cup for the first time in their 70-year history. Gavin Massey opened the scoring for the visitors after 14-minutes, and Sanchez Watt doubled the lead seven minutes later. Sears scored Colchester's third of the match on 26-minutes from the penalty spot. Justin Bennett pulled a goal back for the hosts on 39-minutes, but Alex Gilbey put the U's firmly back in front prior to half-time. Gosport once again reduced the deficit to 4–2 as Bennett scored his second of the game, before Sears scored his second of the game on 78-minutes. Both teams scored in stoppage time as Sammie Szmodics registered his first professional goal, before Lee Wort finalised the 6–3 result.

Following the FA Cup game, Humes brought in defender Jamie Harney on loan from West Ham for two months on 12 November, while Ipswich defender Elliott Hewitt returned to the club for a further month-long loan spell on 13 November.

Academy product Michael O'Donoghue was handed his professional debut on 14 November against Barnsley in an unfamiliar defence following injuries to Magnus Okuonghae and Frankie Kent. Barnsley took the lead after just four minutes, but Sanchez Watt equalised on 15-minutes. Sean Clohessy fouled Devante Cole in the penalty area and Conor Hourihane converted. Barnsley then scored their third through Peter Ramage but Freddie Sears scored his twelfth goal of the season in a 3–2 win for Barnsley.

On 18 November it was announced George Moncur had signed a permanent contract with the club until summer 2017. The defence was also bolstered by the loan signing of Queens Park Rangers youngster Cole Kpekawa joining in an initial month-long deal.

On 21 November, Marcus Bean, who had not featured under Humes, was loaned out by the club to League Two side Portsmouth until early January with a view to a permanent move. Meanwhile, development squad player Billy Roast joined Isthmian League Premier Division outfit AFC Hornchurch on loan until 20 December.

On 22 November, Colchester hosted Coventry City, who consigned the U's to their third consecutive league defeat with a 1–0 victory, in a match that saw Magnus Okuonghae ruled out for the rest of the season with a ruptured achilles tendon. With this news, Humes made another loan signing of Birmingham City's Will Packwood until 1 January.

On 26 November, experienced defender David Wright left the club by mutual consent following a series of niggling injuries and having made only three substitute appearances this season.

A makeshift defence lined-up at Milton Keynes Dons on 29 November as Elliott Hewitt, Cole Kpekawa and debutant Will Packwood started alongside Tom Eastman, the only contracted Colchester played in the back four. Dele Alli scored after four minutes before Benik Afobe doubled the home side's lead on 37-minutes, and then scored his second on the stroke of half-time. He completed his hat-trick on 58-minutes, before Packwood was sent off on his debut after fouling Afobe in the penalty area. Ben Reeves converted to make it 5–0 as Humes brought on Jamie Harney for his professional debut. Lee Hodson then completed the scoring to make it 6–0.

December
Dominic Vose left the club by mutual consent on 2 December having failed to attract interest for a loan move away, while Kemar Roofe returned to his parent club after amassing 35 minutes of playing time during his loan spell.

Prior to Colchester's FA Cup second round fixture against Peterborough United, the club brought in experienced Latvia international defender Kaspars Gorkšs on a short-term contract.

Having reached the second round of the FA Cup for the first time since 2011, Colchester faced Peterborough at home. Kaspars Gorkšs was placed straight into the first-team squad. Sanchez Watt fouled Michael Bostwick in the penalty area but Sam Walker saved the resulting penalty from Aaron McLean two minutes from full-time. Colchester countered from this and George Moncur scored in the first minute of stoppage time to seal a 1–0 win for the U's.

Following the cup triumph, Will Packwood returned to Birmingham on 11 December following a groin injury. On 12 December, Sam Walker extended his contract with the club for a further year until summer 2016.

On 13 December, Colchester suffered another heavy league defeat when Rochdale won 4–1 at the Community Stadium. Gavin Massey scored the only goal for the U's.

Worsening Colchester's injury woes was Michael O'Donoghue who only shortly after making his first-team bow was ruled out for nine months after rupturing his cruciate ligaments in training on 16 December. Three loanees then extended their stays with the club as Rhys Healey signed on until the end of the season, while Elliott Hewitt and Cole Kpekawa both agreed to a further month.

Colchester ended a run of five successive defeats on 20 December with a 1–0 win over Yeovil Town at Huish Park with Craig Eastmond's first goal of the season.

In the Boxing Day fixture against Gillingham, Colchester were defeated 2–1 at home with Sammie Szmodics scoring the U's goal.

A goalless draw away at Crawley Town on 28 December rounded off the year with Colchester still two points away from safety in the relegation zone.

January
Colchester had been drawn away to Championship side Cardiff City in the third round of the FA Cup on 2 January. The game, televised on BBC Two Wales took place in front of a sparse crowd of just 4,194, the lowest ever attendance at the Cardiff City Stadium in protest of the club's ownership. Cardiff had a 3–0 lead after an hour, but Freddie Sears scored a consolation for Colchester to bring his tally for the season to 13 goals. Both Tom Lapslie and Dion Sembie-Ferris were sent on as substitutes to make their professional debuts in the game.

Dominic Smith joined Billy Roast at AFC Hornchurch in a one-month loan deal, while David Fox agreed an extension to his short-term contract until the end of the season. Marcus Bean returned from his Portsmouth loan, but the club cancelled his contract by mutual consent the same day before signing for Wycombe Wanderers. Kaspars Gorkšs signed a short-term contract with the club, while former loanee Alex Wynter joined on an 18-month contract from Crystal Palace.

January's league fixtures began on 10 January with an away win at Peterborough United. Freddie Sears struck his tenth league goal of the season before Elliott Hewitt sealed a 2–0 victory with his first professional goal.

With his contract set to expire in the summer, top-scorer Freddie Sears made a move to Championship side Ipswich Town for an undisclosed fee on 16 January.

On 17 January, Colchester lost 2–0 to Walsall in their fifth successive home defeat.

Following Sears' move to Ipswich, Colchester and Ipswich confirmed the loan move of Jack Marriott until the end of the season, while Elliott Hewitt extended his stay for a further month.

On 22 January, Colchester confirmed the signings of two further players with the arrival of Chris Porter from Sheffield United on an 18-month contract, and Millwall defender Matthew Briggs on loan until the end of the season.

Porter and Briggs were handed their debuts on 24 January in a relegation battle with Leyton Orient, while Tom Lapslie was granted his first start and home debut. Gavin Massey opened the scoring on 14-minutes and Kaspars Gorkšs doubled the lead with his first goal for the club shortly after half-time. Elliott Hewitt was sent off for a professional foul with six minutes remaining but Colchester held on for their third home win of the season.

On 26 January, development squad players Nnamdi Nwachuku and Billy Roast both had their contracts cancelled by mutual consent. Josh Thompson then also had his contract terminated as he joined Tranmere permanently on 28 January. Jamie Harney agreed a permanent deal with the club until summer 2016, while Kaspar Gorkšs' short-term deal expired and he joined Superleague Greece side Ergotelis. Colchester signed Tottenham Hotspur youth product Kenny McEvoy on loan until the end of the season on 30 January.

Chris Porter scored his first goal for the club on 31 January in Colchester's 1–1 draw with Bradford City at Valley Parade.

February
Transfer deadline day fell on 2 February as two more players left the club. Having fallen out of favour under Tony Humes and with six months remaining on his contract, Craig Eastmond left the club by mutual consent. Dan Holman left to join Dover Athletic on loan until the end of the season.

On 7 February, Colchester faced Crewe at the Community Stadium. Chris Porter scored his second goal in three games for the U's to give the home side a 1–0 advantage at the interval. However, three goals for the visitors without reply in the second-half gave Crewe victory, while Jack Marriott pulled one back for the U's three minutes after arriving on the pitch as a substitute.

Another defeat followed on 10 February as Sheffield United beat the U's 4–1 at Bramall Lane, Sammie Szmodics with Colchester's consolation goal.

On 14 February, Szmodics scored in his second successive game to hand the U's a 1–0 win over Oldham.

On 17 February, Colchester hosted Milton Keynes Dons, who won 1–0 through a Dele Alli goal.

Colchester hosted League One leaders Bristol City on 21 February and took the lead after just three minutes when Tom Lapslie headed in his first professional goal. Eleven minutes later, Macauley Bonne scored his first goal of the season to double the lead. Chris Porter then made it 3–0 after 26-minutes. City pulled a goal back on 50-minutes, and Aden Flint scored on 61-minutes to make it 3–2, but the U's held on for a vital win to move them out of the relegation zone for the first time since November.

Following his goal in the previous match, Macauley Bonne was handed a -year contract extension with his original deal expiring in the summer. On 26 February, Bristol City allowed Karleigh Osborne to join the U's on loan until the end of the season.

Colchester suffered a 2–0 defeat at Doncaster Rovers on 28 February, dropping them back into the relegation zone.

March
Colchester lost 1–0 at home to Notts County on 3 March.

Still refusing to play under Tony Humes, Jabo Ibehre was loaned out to League One rivals Barnsley on 6 March until the end of the season.

On 7 March, Colchester suffered a 2–1 defeat at Rochdale, with Chris Porter scoring a penalty for the visitors.

Colchester were leapfrogged by relegation rivals Crawley Town on 14 March after suffering their twelfth home defeat of the campaign. Sammie Szmodics had given the U's the lead after 11-minutes, but former U's player Ryan Dickson equalised on 15-minutes. Crawley took the lead before half-time, but David Fox's first goal of his second spell with the club from a free kick levelled the score. Former Colchester loanee Izale McLeod scored the winner for Crawley from the penalty spot after being brought down by Sam Walker. The game featured newly signed Norwich City loanee Jacob Murphy, while South Africa captain Bongani Khumalo signed from Tottenham on loan until the end of the season but did not receive international clearance in time to face Crawley. Fellow Spurs player Kenny McEvoy returned to White Hart Lane after making just one substitute appearance for Colchester.

Colchester hosted League One's bottom club Yeovil Town on 17 March. The U's won 2–0 through a David Fox penalty and a Jacob Murphy goal. Having started in the game, Rhys Healey was recalled from his season long loan by Cardiff on 19 March. Meanwhile, young midfielder Conor Hubble was released by the club.

On 21 March, Colchester drew 2–2 with Gillingham. George Moncur broke the deadlock on 62-minutes, but Max Ehmer levelled eight-minutes from full-time. Chris Porter scored five minutes later to put the U's back in front, but after four minutes of stoppage time, Matthew Briggs was sent off for a second bookable offence, after which Gillingham scored a late equaliser through Doug Loft.

Ipswich recalled Elliott Hewitt from his loan with the club on 26 March. To replace the departing Hewitt, Humes drafted in further defensive cover, signing Rotherham United's right-back Richard Brindley on loan until the end of the season.

April
On 2 April, Rhys Healey rejoined Colchester from Cardiff on loan until the end of the season.

Colchester battled to an important 2–1 win over Port Vale on 3 April courtesy of George Moncur and Jacob Murphy goals. Despite the victory, Colchester remained four points from safety with seven games remaining. Karleigh Osborne, an unused substitute in the win, was then recalled by his parent club Bristol City after making four appearances until a hamstring injury ruled him out of action.

Colchester earned their first back-to-back victories of the season on 6 April when they beat play-off chasing Barnsley 3–1 at the Community Stadium. Barnsley took a 40th-minute lead through George Waring, but after the break the U's scored three unanswered goals in 24 minutes. Gavin Massey levelled on 62-minutes, before turning provider to Jabob Murphy on 80-minutes. Six minutes later, George Moncur's third goal in as many games sealed an important win and reduced the gap to safety to just two points.

The U's suffered two consecutive away defeats, first 1–0 to Coventry City on 11 April, and then a humiliating 6–0 thrashing by Chesterfield on 14 April, with the hosts scoring three in each half.

On 18 April, Colchester hosted Scunthorpe United. Scunthorpe took a 30th-minute lead, and they held on until the 81st-minute when Tom Eastman levelled with his first goal of the season. Chris Porter then made it 2–1 to the home side as they looked to close the gap on the sides above them in the table, but Hakeeb Adelakun scored with a deflected effort after two minutes of injury time to cost the U's two points. This meant the U's remained four points from safety with a possible nine available.

Despite the receding chances of League One survival, chairman Robbie Cowling publicly backed manager Tony Humes on 20 April, stating whether the club survive in League One for another season or not, Humes would remain in his role for 2015–16.

Tom Lapslie signed a three-year contract extension on 23 April.

Colchester made their final away trip of the season to Fleetwood Town on 25 April. The U's took the lead just after the break through George Moncur, but were pegged back on 65-minutes. Fleetwood then took the lead ten minutes later, and with results standing as they were, Colchester would be relegated. They scored an equaliser through Gavin Massey on 84-minutes, and three minutes later, Dion Sembie-Ferris was fouled in the penalty area. Chris Porter stepped up to convert the penalty and secure a crucial three points for his side, with the U's now two points from safety but with a game in hand over their relegation rivals.

With an opportunity to lift themselves out of the relegation places with a win at home to Swindon on 28 April, Colchester had the best possible start when Jacob Murphy tapped in after just 37-seconds of their encounter. Colchester were made to pay for missed chances in the first-half however when Swindon equalised on 53-minutes. The home side pushed for a winner but settled for a 1–1 draw, leaving them 22nd in League One, one point from safety and relying on a final day win over Preston and other results working for them to survive the threat of relegation.

May
The final game of the 2014–15 season was to be played at the Community Stadium against Preston North End, who were second in League One and needing to match Milton Keynes Dons result against Yeovil Town to gain promotion to the Championship. Anything but a win against Preston would mean relegation for Colchester, while they needed to rely on other results working in their favour to survive. With so much riding on the game, the match was selected to be shown live on Sky Sports. In an end-to-end game, Colchester were under pressure from Preston but defended resolutely to keep the score at 0–0 at half-time. George Moncur was fouled in the penalty area by Preston goalkeeper Sam Johnstone, and Chris Porter stepped up to take the kick. However, he sent the ball over the bar. In the 82nd-minute, Chris Porter held the ball up for George Moncur to score the crucial goal that gave Colchester a 1–0 lead. They held off a Preston onslaught for the remainder of normal time and five minutes of added time. With relegation rivals Crawley, Crewe, and Notts County, and Leyton Orient only managing a draw, the U's remained in League One by two points, finished in 19th-position and safety. Colchester's performance and result against Preston earned the club the League Managers Association 'Performance of the 'Week' award, as voted by the panel consisting of LMA chairman Howard Wilkinson, Alex Ferguson, Joe Royle, Dave Bassett, and Barry Fry.

Players

Transfers

In

 Total spending:  ~ £0

Out

 Total incoming:  ~ £0

Loans in

Loans out

Contracts
New contracts and contract extensions.

Match details

Friendlies

League One

League table

Results round by round

Matches

Football League Cup

Football League Trophy

FA Cup

Squad statistics

Appearances and goals

|-
!colspan="16"|Players who appeared for Colchester who left during the season

|}

Goalscorers

Disciplinary record

Captains
Number of games played as team captain.

Clean sheets
Number of games goalkeepers kept a clean sheet.

Player debuts
Players making their first-team Colchester United debut in a fully competitive match.

Honours and awards
Players to receive awards at the club's End of Season Awards Dinner held on 8 May 2015.

See also
List of Colchester United F.C. seasons

References

General

Specific

2014-15
2014–15 Football League One by team